Mark Lepak (born August 1, 1956) is an American politician who has served in the Oklahoma House of Representatives from the 9th district since 2014.

References

1956 births
Living people
Republican Party members of the Oklahoma House of Representatives
21st-century American politicians